William Farrar Smith (February 17, 1824February 28, 1903), known as "Baldy" Smith, was a Union general in the American Civil War, notable for attracting the extremes of glory and blame. He was praised for his gallantry in the Seven Days Battles and the Battle of Antietam, but was demoted for insubordination after the disastrous defeat at the Battle of Fredericksburg. As chief engineer of the Army of the Cumberland, he achieved recognition by restoring a supply line that saved that army from starvation and surrender, known as the "Cracker Line", that helped Union troops to success in the Chattanooga Campaign in the autumn of 1863. Leading the first operation against Petersburg, Smith's hesitation, possibly illness-related, cost the Union a prime opportunity for a quick end to the war. He was relieved of command shortly thereafter.

Early life
Smith, known to his friends as "Baldy", was born at St. Albans, Vermont, the son of Ashbel and Sarah Butler Smith, and a cousin of J. Gregory Smith (governor of Vermont, 1863–1865). He was educated locally in Vermont until he attended the United States Military Academy at West Point in 1841, and graduated four years later standing fourth of 41 cadets. Smith was appointed a brevet second lieutenant on July 1, 1845, and was assigned to the Topographical Engineers Corps. He was promoted to second lieutenant on July 14, 1849, and promoted to first lieutenant on March 3, 1853.

During his service in the Corps, Smith conducted surveys of the Great Lakes, the states of Texas, Arizona, and Florida, as well as much of Mexico. While serving in Florida, Smith was stricken with the infectious disease malaria. Although he would recover at the time, the illness affected his physical health for the rest of his life. In 1856 Smith began his involvement in the lighthouse service, which was headquartered in Detroit, Michigan, and eventually rose to become the Engineer Secretary of the Lighthouse Board.

Smith was also twice assistant professor of mathematics at West Point (1846–48 and 1855–56). He was promoted to captain on July 1, 1859.

Civil War
During the First Battle of Bull Run, Smith served on the staff of Brig. Gen. Irvin McDowell. On August 13, 1861, he was appointed a brigadier general in the Union Army after helping organize the 1st Vermont Brigade. He was appointed a brevet lieutenant colonel in the regular army for his gallantry at the Battle of White Oak Swamp in the Seven Days Battles. On July 4, 1862, he received promotion to the rank of major general in the Union Army. Smith led his division with conspicuous valor during the Battle of Antietam, and was again brevetted in the regular army. When his corps commander, Maj. Gen. William B. Franklin, was reassigned to a superior command, Smith was placed at the head of the VI Corps of the Army of the Potomac, which he led at the disastrous Battle of Fredericksburg.

The recriminations that followed Fredericksburg led to a famous general order in which army commander Maj. Gen. Ambrose Burnside proposed to dismiss several of the senior officers of the army. President Abraham Lincoln prevented this order from taking effect and relieved Burnside of his command instead. Smith was one of the affected officers, but it is to his credit that he did not leave the Army. However, his indiscretion in communicating to Lincoln directly about Burnside's shortcomings, compounded by the fact that Smith was a close friend of out-of-favor Maj. Gen. George B. McClellan, resulted in his losing both his corps command and his rank; the Senate failed to confirm his nomination to major general, which expired on March 4, 1863. Reverting to the rank of brigadier general, he commanded a division-sized force of militia within the Department of the Susquehanna in Pennsylvania during the critical days of the Gettysburg Campaign, repelling Maj. Gen. J.E.B. Stuart at a skirmish in Carlisle. Smith's green troops then participated in the unsuccessful pursuit of Gen. Robert E. Lee back to the Potomac River. He followed this in division command in West Virginia.

On October 3, 1863, Smith was assigned to duty as chief engineer of the Army of the Cumberland (and a couple of weeks later, the Military Division of the Mississippi). As such he conducted the engineer operations and launched the Battle of Brown's Ferry, which opened the "Cracker Line" to provide supplies and reinforcements to the besieged troops in Chattanooga. Of this action the House Committee on Military Affairs reported in 1865 that "as a subordinate, General WF Smith had saved the Army of the Cumberland from capture, and afterwards directed it to victory." Smith was then renominated for the rank of major general of volunteers. Ulysses S. Grant, who was much impressed with Smith's work, insisted strongly that the nomination should be confirmed, which was accordingly done by the Senate on March 9, 1864. Grant, according to his own statement "was not long in finding out that the objections to Smith's promotion were well grounded," but he never said what the grounds were, while Smith, contributing to a major series of war memoirs, maintained that they were purely of a personal character.

For the Overland Campaign of 1864, Smith was assigned by Grant to command the XVIII Corps in Maj. Gen. Benjamin Butler's Army of the James, which he led in the Battle of Cold Harbor and the first operations against Petersburg. Smith's corps and a division of black troops (under Edward W. Hinks) were ordered to take the city. Remembering the debacle at Cold Harbor, Smith performed exhaustive reconnaissance. Determining that the section of the defensive line was manned primarily by artillery, he ordered an attack. However, the attack was delayed and in the meantime he became apprehensive about a rumor circulating that Lee was about to arrive. He lost his nerve, perhaps because of the formidable character of the Confederate works or perhaps because of a recurring bout with malaria, but his hesitation may have lost him the opportunity to shorten the war by nearly a year. On July 19, 1864, he was relieved from command of the XVIII Corps and he spent the remainder of the war on "special duty."

Postbellum career
Smith resigned from the volunteer service in 1865, and from the U.S. Army in 1867. From 1864 to 1873 he was president of the International Telegraph Company, and from 1875 to 1881 served on the board of police commissioners of New York City, becoming its president in 1877. After 1881 he was engaged in civil engineering work in Pennsylvania. He died at Philadelphia in 1903 and is buried in Arlington National Cemetery. His Autobiography of Major General William F. Smith, 1861–1864 was published posthumously in 1990.

See also

 List of American Civil War generals (Union)

References

Further reading
 
 Warner, Ezra J. Generals in Blue: Lives of the Union Commanders. Baton Rouge: Louisiana State University Press, 1964. .

External links
 

1824 births
1903 deaths
People from Franklin County, Vermont
Union Army generals
United States Military Academy alumni
Burials at Arlington National Cemetery
People of Vermont in the American Civil War
Vermont Brigade